Geodia distincta is a species of sponge in the family Geodiidae. It is found in the waters of the Java Sea. The species was first described by Nils Gustaf Lindgren in 1897.

References

Bibliography 
 Lindgren, N.G. (1897). Beitrag zur Kenntniss der Spongienfauna des Malaiischen Archipels und der Chinesischen Meere. Zoologische Anzeiger. 547: 480-487

Tetractinellida
Sponges described in 1897